OF or Of may refer to:

Arts and media
 Odd Future, a Los Angeles–based hip-hop collective
 Operation Flashpoint, a video game series

Organizations
 Air Finland, a defunct Finnish airline (IATA airline code OF)
 , or the Civic Forum, a Czech political movement established during the Velvet Revolution in 1989
 , the Liberation Front of the Slovene Nation, the main anti-fascist Slovene civil resistance and political organization active during World War II

Places
 Of, Turkey, a town and district in Trabzon Province
 Offenbach (district) and Offenbach am Main (German vehicle registration plates codes OF)

Post-nominals
 Officer of the Order of Fiji, which has the post-nominal letters of OF
 Old Fettesian, sometimes used as post-nominal letters to identify alumni of the British public school Fettes College, Edinburgh, Scotland

Science and technology
 Open Firmware, computer software which loads an operating system
 Oxygen fluoride, a compound containing only the chemical elements oxygen and fluorine

Other uses
 of, an English preposition
 Ordinary Form, in Roman Catholicism
 Old French, a dialect continuum spoken from the 9th century to the 14th century
 OnlyFans, an internet content subscription service
 Outfielder, a defensive position in baseball

See also 
 Oxygen-free (disambiguation)